Gail Finney (August 16, 1959 – August 20, 2022) was an American businesswoman and politician who was a Democratic member of the Kansas House of Representatives, who represented the 84th house district from 2009 until her death in 2022.

Background
Finney was born in Wichita, Kansas. She was a graduate of Southeast High School, had a Bachelor of Business Administration degree from Wichita State University and an MBA from Friends University. She was a business owner.

Political career
Finney served on the Wichita Chamber of Commerce's Visioneering Racial, Diversity, Opportunities, and Harmony Board; the District 1 Advisory Board, Precinct Committee Woman, and the
Governor's Kansas African American Advisory Commission.

Issue positions
On her website, Finney listed her legislative priorities as:

Ensuring a quality education for all Kansas children,
Bringing the cost of health care and prescription drugs down,
Working with all levels of government and the private sector to grow our economy and expand our job base.

2016 committee memberships
Her assignments for the 2015–2016 Session Committees were:
House Appropriations
House Corrections and Juvenile Justice
House Transportation and Public Safety Budgets, Ranking Democrat

Sponsored legislation
H 5003 Kansas constitutional amendment; equal rights; no discrimination based on sex. January 23, 2009
H 5014 Expanded rail service; Kansas City to Fort Worth, Texas; congratulating Kansas Department of Transportation and others; urging action. March 17, 2009
In February 2014, it was discovered that Finney wants Kansas caregivers (including teachers and parents) to be allowed to spank children to the point of bruising without consequence.

Major donors
The top 5 donors to Finney's 2008 campaign were mostly individual donors:
1. Finney, Gail $4,991
2. Kansas Contractors Assoc $750
3. Kansans for Lifesaving Cures $750
4. Finney Jr, Jerrold 	$500
5. Finney Sr, Jerrold 	$500

Death
After a series of health problems, Finney died on August 20, 2022, aged 63. She had undergone a kidney transplant earlier in the year. She was posthumously given the key to the city of Wichita.

References

External links
 
 Kansas Legislature – Gail Finney
 Project Vote Smart profile
 Kansas Votes profile
 Campaign contributions: 1998, 2008

1959 births
2022 deaths
20th-century American businesswomen
20th-century American businesspeople
21st-century African-American politicians
21st-century American politicians
21st-century American women politicians
African-American women in business
African-American state legislators in Kansas
African-American women in politics
Businesspeople from Kansas
Friends University alumni
Democratic Party members of the Kansas House of Representatives
Place of death missing
Politicians from Wichita, Kansas
Wichita Southeast High School alumni
Wichita State University alumni
Women state legislators in Kansas